A levitated dipole is a type of nuclear fusion reactor design using a superconducting torus which is magnetically levitated inside the reactor chamber. The name refers to the magnetic dipole that forms within the reaction chamber, similar to Earth's or Jupiter's magnetospheres. It is believed that such an apparatus could contain plasma more efficiently than other fusion reactor designs. The concept of the levitated dipole as a fusion reactor was first theorized by Akira Hasegawa in 1987.

Concept 
The Earth's magnetic field is generated by the circulation of charges in the Earth's molten core. The resulting magnetic dipole field forms a shape with magnetic field lines passing through the Earth's center, reaching the surface near the poles and extending far into space above the equator. Charged particles entering the field will tend to follow the lines of force, moving north or south. As they reach the polar regions, the magnetic lines begin to cluster together, and this increasing field can cause particles below a certain energy threshold to reflect, and begin travelling in the opposite direction. Such particles bounce back and forth between the poles until they collide with other particles. Particles with greater energy continue towards the Earth, impacting the atmosphere and causing the aurora.

This basic concept is used in the magnetic mirror approach to fusion energy. The mirror uses a solenoid to confine the plasma in the center of a cylinder, and then two magnets at either end to force the magnetic lines closer together to create reflecting areas. One of the most promising of the early approaches to fusion, the mirror ultimately proved to be very "leaky", with the fuel refusing to properly reflect from the ends as the density and energy were increased. Annoyingly, it was the particles with the most energy, those most likely to undergo fusion, that preferentially escaped. Research into large mirror machines ended in the 1980s as it became clear they would not reach fusion breakeven in a practically sized device.

The levitated dipole can be thought of, in some ways, as a toroidal mirror, much more similar to the Earth's field than the linear system in a traditional mirror. In this case, the confinement area is not the linear area between the mirrors, but the toroidal area around the outside of the central magnet, similar to the area around the Earth's equator. Particles in this area that move up or down see increasing magnetic density and tend to move back towards the equator area again. This gives the system some level of natural stability. Particles with higher energy, the ones that would escape a traditional mirror, instead follow the field lines through the hollow center of the magnet, recirculating back into the equatorial area again.

This makes the levitated dipole unique when compared with other magnetic confinement machines.  In those experiments, small fluctuations can cause significant energy loss. By contrast, in a dipolar magnetic field, fluctuations tend to compress the plasma, without energy loss. This compression effect was first noticed by Akira Hasegawa (of the Hasegawa-Mima equation) after participating in the Voyager 2 encounter with Uranus.

Examples 

The concept of the levitated dipole was first realized when Jay Kesner of MIT and Michael Mauel of Columbia University made a joint proposal to test the concept in 1997. This led to the development of two experiments: the Levitated Dipole Experiment (LDX) at MIT and the Collisionless Terrella Experiment (CTX) at Columbia University.

See also 
List of plasma physics articles

References 

Plasma physics
Magnetic confinement fusion